Gyula Bárdos  (born 15 March 1958) is an ethnic Hungarian politician in Slovakia, who was candidate in 2014 Slovak presidential election, running as a member of the Party of the Hungarian Community (SMK–MKP). He came in fifth with 5.1%. His daughter is actress Judit Bárdos.

References 

1958 births
Living people
Politicians from Bratislava
Hungarians in Slovakia
Party of the Hungarian Community politicians
Candidates for President of Slovakia
Members of the National Council (Slovakia) 2002-2006
Members of the National Council (Slovakia) 2006-2010